

This is a list of the National Register of Historic Places listings in Texas County, Oklahoma.

This is intended to be a complete list of the properties on the National Register of Historic Places in Texas County, Oklahoma, United States. The locations of National Register properties for which the latitude and longitude coordinates are included below, may be seen in a map.

There are 24 properties listed on the National Register in the county, including 1 National Historic Landmark.

Current listings

|}

See also

 List of National Historic Landmarks in Oklahoma
 National Register of Historic Places listings in Oklahoma

References

 
Texas County